Scott Morrison (born 1968) is an Australian politician and Prime Minister of Australia from 2018 to 2022.

Scott Morrison, Scotty Morrison, or variation, may also refer to:

People
 Scott Morrison (footballer) (born 1984), retired Scottish footballer
 Scott Morrison (basketball player) (born 1986), Canadian professional basketball player
 Scott Morrison (basketball coach), Canadian basketball head coach
 Scott Morrison (journalist) (born 1958), Canadian sports writer

 Scotty Morrison (broadcaster), New Zealand broadcaster and linguist
 Scotty Morrison (born 1930), hockey referee and executive
 Joseph G. "Scottie" Morrison, Canadian ship builder; see List of steamboats on the Yukon River

Other uses
 Scott Morrison Award of Minor Hockey Excellence, a Canadian award

See also 

 
 Scomo (disambiguation)
 Morrison (disambiguation)
 Scott (disambiguation)